Saint Privat is a group formed in 2002 by singer Valérie Sajdik and electronica musician Klaus Waldeck, named after the village of Saint-Privat in Southern France, where Valérie Sajdik decided to live.

Saint Privat's first album Riviera, released in 2004, led to the band being awarded the Amadeus Austrian Music Award for newcomer of the year in 2005. This success was followed up in 2006 by Superflu, which shifted the balance from the electronica towards the musicians.

Discography

Singles 
Tous les jours (2004)
Somebody to love (2006)

Albums
Riviera (2004)
Superflu (2006)

References

Austrian electronic music groups
Musical groups from Vienna